Domestic guineafowl, sometimes called pintade, pearl hen, or gleany, is poultry originating from Africa. They are the domesticated form of the helmeted guineafowl (Numida meleagris) and are related to other game birds such as the pheasants, turkeys and partridges. Although the timing of their domestication is unknown, there is evidence that domestic guineafowl were present in Greece by the 5th century BC.

They lay 25–30 eggs in a deep, tapering nest. Their eggs are small, dark and extremely thick-shelled. The hens have a habit of hiding their nests, and sharing it with other hens until large numbers of eggs have accumulated. The incubation period is 26–28 days, and the chicks are called "keets". As keets, they are highly susceptible to  dampness (they are indigenous to the more arid regions of Africa) and can die from following the mother through dewy grass.  After their first two to six weeks of growth, though, they can be some of the hardiest domestic land fowl.

Sexing the birds is not as simple as telling a rooster from a hen chicken. When they are adults, the helmet and wattles of the male are larger than those of the female (Guinea-hen), and only the female makes the two-note cry imitated as "Buck-wheat!" or "Pot-rack!" while the male only has a one-note cry. Aside from that, though, the two sexes are mostly identical in appearance.

As domestics, guineafowl are valuable pest controllers, eating many insects. They are especially beneficial in controlling the Lyme disease-carrying deer tick, as well as wasp nests. While they are rarely kept in large numbers, a few are sometimes kept with other fowl to be used as a security system against birds of prey. They will call with their loud, high shrieking voices if concerned about intruders.  They are highly social birds and tend to languish when alone.

Within the domesticated species, many color variations have been bred forth aside from the "pearl" or natural color of the helmeted guinea. These include white, purple, slate, chocolate, lavender, coral blue, bronze, pewter, buff dundotte, blonde, and various pieds.

It can be cooked using any recipe that calls for chicken, but is considered to be more flavorful and, because of its higher cost, is generally served at special occasions. It is particularly common in French and Italian recipes.

References
 Madge and McGowan, Pheasants, Partridges and Grouse 
J.S. Ferguson, Gardening with Guineas  Comprehensive discussion of all aspects of raising domestic guineafowl.

External links
A source of guineafowl links, message board, chat room, book, and hundreds of photographs and information about raising guineafowl.
Guinea Fowl International Association (GFIA) Worldwide nonprofit organization, based in Texas, USA, providing support and information to those interested in the keeping and breeding of guineafowl. Forum, breeders list, color chart, and latest news about domestic guineafowl.

Domesticated birds
Poultry